Big Picture Science is the national science radio program and podcast, produced at the SETI Institute and hosted by Senior Astronomer Seth Shostak and journalist Molly Bentley, the executive producer of the show.

The program uses innovative storytelling to connect trends in contemporary research and technology. Episodes are thematic, providing in-depth discussion of particular developments in science. Topics covered include the latest developments in science. Guests include researchers from academic, public and private spheres (including NASA), popular science writers, cultural critics, engineers, and ethicists focused on science. Once a month an episode, "Skeptic Check," is devoted to critical thinking and takes on topics in junk science and the paranormal.

The show is broadcast on approximately 155 radio stations, many of them NPR affiliates. These include KALW in San Francisco, WCMU-FM in Michigan, WVPE in Indiana, WHRV in Virginia, WIEC in Wisconsin, and WNYE in New York City, as well as World FM in Tawa, Wellington, New Zealand, and American Forces Network. The show is also available for download via podcast and direct download from podcast networks as well as the show's website where archived shows from 2006 on can also be found. Episodes are cut to an NPR clock.

Big Picture Science was formerly titled Are We Alone?

References

External links

Search for extraterrestrial intelligence
American talk radio programs
Audio podcasts
Science podcasts
2002 radio programme debuts